Makkal Pavalar Inkulab (also spelt Inquilab, Inkulab or Ingulab) (c. 1944 – 1 December 2016) was an Indian rationalist Tamil poet/writer, activist, and Communist with Marxist Leninist inclination. He retired as a professor of Tamil at The New College, Chennai, Tamil Nadu. His birth name is Shahul Hameed and a known follower of Periyar.

His poems espousing rationality have been critically acclaimed. Kanmani Rajam, his most famous poem, criticizes the moral bankruptcy of politicians.

His song/poem Naanga Manushangada (We are human beings) is a famous Dalit-freedom song that is still played in many Dalit gatherings. Avvai, his drama is considered to be the first modern Tamil drama, and a prescribed textbook for many colleges. In this revisionist account, the historical/mythic poet Avvai, contrary to the prevalent image of her as an old, wise, celibate woman, is rendered as a young, sensuous, creative, 'free' person, a wandering bard. The play also challenges the patriarchal view which has marginalized the female voice.

His other famous literary works include modern versions of Manimekalai and Kurinji Paatu.

He was also involved in vocal expression of discontent of removal of statue of a Tamil legendary icon Kannaki in 2002 by the then All India Anna Dravida Munnetra Kazhagam (AIADMK) government of Tamil Nadu. He died at the age of 72 on 1 December 2016.
He has been selected posthumously for the Sahitya Akademi Award for his book Kaandhal Naatkal in 2017. However, his family declined the award, saying he did not write expecting awards and felicitations.

References 

1940s births
2016 deaths
Tamil-language writers
Indian atheism activists
Year of birth missing
Writers from Chennai
20th-century Indian poets
Poets from Tamil Nadu
Recipients of the Sahitya Akademi Award in Tamil